Jean-Claude Michéa, born in 1950, is a retired philosophy professor and French philosopher, author of several essays devoted in particular to the thought and work of George Orwell. Libertarian socialist, he is known for his committed positions against the dominant currents of the left which, according to him, has lost all spirits of anti-capitalist struggle to make way for the “religion of progress”. Advocating several moral values near the George Orwell's socialism, Jean-Claude Michéa excoriates the leftist intelligentsia that had, according to him, got away from the proletarian and popular world. He champions collective moral values in a society more and more individualistic and liberal, using only the law and the economy to justify itself. He “considers that the liberal bourgeois models had prevailed upon socialism, in swallowing it up” and “regrets that the socialism had accepted the political liberalism’s theories”

Bibliography 
 
 
 
  (with Alain Finkielkraut and Pascal Bruckner)
 , republication Champs-Flammarion, 2006
 
 , rep. Champs-Flammarion, 2010
 
 
 L'Âme de l'homme sous le capitalisme (in French), postscript of La Culture de l’égoïsme - Discussion entre C. Lasch et C.Castoriadis, Climats, 2012 
 
 
  ; with Jacques Julliard

References

External links 
 Interview of Jean-Claude Michéa, (in French) La Gazette, n° 595, September 10–16, 1999
 « Pour un anarchisme conservateur », Interview of Jean-Claude Michéa (in French), Le Nouvel Observateur, September 27, 2011
 « Retour sur l'Empire du moindre mal » on the French website contrepoints.org, April 12, 2013

20th-century French essayists
21st-century French essayists
21st-century French philosophers
French political philosophers
1950 births
Libertarian socialists
Living people